Tutti per uno... botte per tutti, internationally released as The Three Musketeers of the West, is a 1973 Italian spaghetti Western-comedy film directed by Bruno Corbucci.

It is a western-comedy version of Alexandre Dumas' novel The Three Musketeers. It has been described as "one of the craziest Spaghetti Westerns ever made" and "an over the top comedy vehicle from start to finish".

Cast 
Timothy Brent as Dart Jr.
George Eastman as  Mc Athos
Chris Huerta as  Portland
Leo Anchóriz as Aramirez
Karin Schubert as  Alice 
Eduardo Fajardo as The Banker
 Hsueh Han as  Cin Ciao

See also        
 List of Italian films of 1973

References

External links

1973 films
Spaghetti Western films
Films directed by Bruno Corbucci
Films based on The Three Musketeers
Films scored by Carlo Rustichelli
Italian parody films
1970s Western (genre) comedy films
West German films
1970s parody films
1973 comedy films
1970s Italian-language films
1970s Italian films